Julien Laidoun (born 24 January 1980) is a French road cyclist, who currently rides for amateur team Pédale Suippase. He was professional from 2002 to 2005, in 2007 and again in 2020. He most notably rode in the 2004 Vuelta a España and finished third in the 2003 Tour du Finistère.

Major results
1998
 1st Classique des Alpes juniors
2002
 7th Overall Le Triptyque des Monts et Châteaux
1st Stage 3
2003
 3rd Tour du Finistère

References

External links

1980 births
Living people
French male cyclists
Sportspeople from Reims
Cyclists from Grand Est